Jesús García Leoz (Olite, Navarra, 10 January 1904 – 1953) was a Spanish composer, particularly noted for his film scores. He was a favourite pupil of Joaquín Turina and one of the "músicos del '27."

Works, editions and recordings
 Cinco canciones para canto e piano (1934) (poems by Juan Paredes) 
 Tríptico de canciones para canto e piano (1937) (poems by Lorca)
 Seis canciones para canto e piano (1939) (poems by Antonio Machado) 
 Dos canciones para canto e piano (1952) (poems by Juan Ramón Jiménez)
 Symphony 
 Sonatina for small orchestra (1945)
 Sonata for Violin and Piano 
 String Quartet in F minor (Opus 2)
 Quartet for Piano and Strings
 Piano Sonatina
 La duquesa del candil (1948) zarzuela in three acts (libretto by Guillermo and Rafael Fernández-Shaw)

Selected filmography
 Fortunato (1942)
 A Palace for Sale (1942)
 I Will Consult Mister Brown (1946)
 The Black Siren (1947)
 Four Women (1947)
 Lady in Ermine (1947)
 Lola Leaves for the Ports (1947)
 The Party Goes On (1948)
 Guest of Darkness (1948)
 Ninety Minutes (1949)
 Night Arrival (1949)
 A Man on the Road (1949)
 Wings of Youth (1949)
 The Maragatan Sphinx (1950)
 Tales of the Alhambra (1950)
 Day by Day (1951)
 Malibran's Song (1951)
 La trinca del aire (1951)
 Love and Desire (1951)
 Spanish Serenade (1952)
 Come Die My Love (1952)
 The Call of Africa (1952)
 Devil's Roundup (1952)
 Lovers of Toledo (1953)
 Women's Town (1953)
 Return to the Truth (1956)
 The Sun Comes Out Every Day (1958)

References

Spanish composers
Spanish male composers
1904 births
1953 deaths
20th-century composers
20th-century Spanish musicians
People from Olite
20th-century Spanish male musicians